LN, Ln or ln may refer to:

Arts and entertainment
 Lawful Neutral, an alignment in Dungeons & Dragons
 The Sims 3: Late Night, the third expansion pack to The Sims 3
 Light novel, a style of Japanese novel for young adults
 LN (band), American slow core band

Government, military and politics
 League of Nations, intergovernmental organisation (19201946)
 Legalman, a United States Navy occupational rating
 Lega Nord, a northern Italian populist political party
 Livable Netherlands, a defunct Dutch political party

Math, science and technology
 Natural logarithm (ln), or logarithm base e, a mathematical function
 ln (Unix), a UNIX command that creates file links
 IBM Lotus Notes, the client of a collaborative client-server platform from IBM
 Lanthanide (of which 'Ln' is an informal name) or lanthanoid, a series of chemical elements
 Liquid nitrogen, the liquefied form of the gas
 Lymph node, an anatomical feature involved in immunological function
 Lightning Network, the decentralized network of Bitcoin to support instant payments

Places
 Lane (Ln), as part of the proper name for a country lane
 Liaoning, a province of China (Guobiao abbreviation LN)
 LN postcode area, in Britain, named after Lincoln

Other uses
 Libyan Airlines, by IATA code
 Louisville and Nashville Railroad, by reporting mark
 Lingala language, by ISO 639 code ln
 Lingnan University, abbreviate as LN